Langdon Brown Gilkey (February 9, 1919 – November 19, 2004) was an American Protestant ecumenical theologian.

Early life and education 
A grandson of Clarence Talmadge Brown, the first Protestant minister to gather a congregation in Salt Lake City, Gilkey grew up in Hyde Park, Chicago. His father Charles Whitney Gilkey was a liberal theologian and the first Dean of the University of Chicago's Rockefeller Chapel; his mother was Geraldine Gunsaulus Brown who was a well known feminist and leader of the YWCA.

Gilkey attended elementary school at the University of Chicago Laboratory School, and in 1936 graduated from the Asheville School for Boys in North Carolina. In 1940, he earned a Bachelor of Arts in philosophy, magna cum laude, from Harvard University, where he lived in Grays Hall during his freshman year. The following year, he went to China to teach English at Yenching University and was subsequently (1943) imprisoned by the Japanese, first under house arrest at the university and later in an internment camp near the city of Weihsien in Shantung Province (where Eric Liddell was a fellow internee).

Career 
After the war, Gilkey obtained his doctorate in religion from Columbia University in New York, being both mentored by and a teaching assistant to Reinhold Niebuhr. He was a Fulbright scholar at Cambridge University (1950–51), and went on to become a professor at Vassar College from 1951 to 1954, and then at Vanderbilt Divinity School from 1954 to 1963. He received a Guggenheim Fellowship in 1960 to study in Munich; another Guggenheim in the mid-1970s took him to Rome. In late 1963 he became a professor at the University of Chicago Divinity School, eventually being named Shailer Mathews Professor of Theology, until his retirement in March 1989. While on sabbatical in 1970, he taught at the University of Utrecht in the Netherlands; in 1975 he taught at Kyoto University in Japan, his lecture series there focusing on the environmental perils of industrialization. After his retirement he continued to lecture until 2001 at both the University of Virginia and Georgetown University. During this last period of his teaching career, he was also for one year a visiting professor at the Theology Division (now Divinity School) of Chung Chi College, the Chinese University of Hong Kong.

Death 
He died of meningitis on November 19, 2004, at the University of Virginia hospital in Charlottesville.  He was 85.

Theological work 
Gilkey was a prolific author, with 15 books and over 100 articles to his credit.
Perhaps his most widely read book was the story of his own religious-theological journey. In Shantung Compound: The Story of Men and Women Under Pressure (1966), Gilkey narrates his departure from the liberal Protestant belief system during World War II when he was made a prisoner of war in the "Civilian Internment Center" near Weihsien for two-and-a-half years (1943–1945).

This experience was the basis for his modern interpretation of classical Reformation insights about individual and societal estrangement and self-delusion. Gilkey's new theology of history rethought Christianity and traditional views on sin, free will, providence, grace, eschatology and secular history.

Gilkey once responded to fellow theologian Edgar Brightman, who believed in God because man's history (to him) represented steady moral progress, saying "I believe in God, because to me, history precisely does not represent such a progress."

Gilkey was respected academically for his work on Reinhold Niebuhr and Paul Tillich, but was popularly known for his writings on science and religion. He argued against both Christian fundamentalist attacks on science and secularist attacks on religion. He was an expert witness for the American Civil Liberties Union in the 1981 McLean v. Arkansas lawsuit against an Arkansas State law mandating the teaching of creation sciences in high schools.

His early books and articles demonstrated the existential power of his experiences, from his early pacifist professions as a student at Harvard University, where his classmates included, among others, future President John F. Kennedy, Pete Seeger, and Cardinal Avery Dulles, to his teaching in China and his experiences as a POW.

His teachers, especially Niebuhr and Tillich, at Union Theological Seminary, helped him with methods and categories to formulate a powerful and creative theological vision of his own.  In the 1970s and 1980s, Gilkey's theological vision was colored by the growth of Buddhism, and Sikhism as both religions began to influence religious life in America.  He held the view most world religions enjoyed "rough parity". "The question for our age," he once wrote, "may well become, not will religion survive, as much as will we survive and with what sort of religion, a creative or demonic one?"

Books 
 Maker of Heaven and Earth: The Christian Doctrine of Creation in the Light of Modern Knowledge 1959. , 
 Shantung Compound 1966. 
 Naming the Whirlwind A Renewal of God Language 1970. 
 Catholicism Confronts Modernity: A Protestant View 1975. , 
 Reaping the Whirlwind: A Christian Interpretation of History 1976. , 
 Message and Existence: An Introduction to Christian Theology 1979. , 
 Through the Tempest: Theological Voyages in a Pluralistic Culture , 
 Nature, Reality, and the Sacred: The Nexus of Science and Religion Minneapolis, Minn. : Fortress Press, 1993. , 
 Creationism on Trial: Evolution and God at Little Rock 1985. , 
 Religion and the Scientific Future: Reflections on Myth, Science, and Theology , 
 Contemporary Explosion of Theology: Ecumenical Studies in Theology , 
 Society and the Sacred: Toward a Theology of Culture in Decline , 
 Gilkey on Tillich 1990. , 
 Blue Twilight: Nature, Creationism, and American Religion
 On Niebuhr: A Theological Study 2001. ,

Notes

Further reading
 
 
 The Theology of Langdon Gilkey: Systematic and Critical Studies,  Kyle Pasewark and Jeff Pool, editors, Merer University
 Whirlwind in Culture: Frontiers in Theology—in Honor of Langdon Gilkey, D. W. Musser and J. L. Price, editors
 "Plurality and Its Theological Implications" in The Myth of Christian Uniqueness, John Hick and Paul Knitter, editors
 Religious Language in a Secular Culture: A Study in the Thought of Langdon Gilkey, J Shea
 Langdon Gilkey: Theologian for a Culture in Decline, B. Walsh.

External links
Guide to the Langdon Gilkey Papers 1921-2004 at the University of Chicago Special Collections Research Center 

American Christian theologians
20th-century Protestant theologians
1919 births
2004 deaths
Asheville School alumni
Deaths from meningitis
People from Chicago
Harvard College alumni
Columbia University alumni
Vassar College faculty
Vanderbilt University faculty
University of Chicago faculty
University of Virginia faculty
Georgetown University faculty
World War II civilian prisoners held by Japan
Protestant missionaries in China
Internees at the Weixian Internment Camp
Academic staff of Yenching University
Presidents of the American Academy of Religion
University of Chicago Laboratory Schools alumni
American Protestant missionaries
American expatriates in China
American prisoners of war in World War II